Strawberry Switchblade is the only studio album released by the Scottish new wave duo Strawberry Switchblade.

Release
The album did not live up to the high chart expectations created by the #5 (UK) single "Since Yesterday". It entered and peaked at #25 on the UK Album Chart in April 1985. The album was promoted by two additional singles: the first, "Let Her Go", reached #59 and the final single, "Who Knows What Love Is?", reached #84 on the UK Singles Chart. "Since Yesterday" also charted in Ireland and the Netherlands where it reached #6 and #24 respectively.

Re-release
The original Strawberry Switchblade LP has not been re-released in the UK (or in Europe) since 1985, though all of its tracks (apart from the short instrumental reprise of "Who Knows What Love Is?") appeared on the group's Platinum Collection compilation. In Japan, where the group were extremely popular, it was issued on CD for the first time in 1989, and released again there on CD in 1997 in a 20-track expanded version, including B-sides, remixes and non-album singles.

Track listing
All songs written by Jill Bryson and Rose McDowall, except where noted.

Original release

Japanese edition

Personnel
Strawberry Switchblade
 Jill Bryson – vocals, harmonies, lead guitar
 Rose McDowall – lead vocals, harmonies, guitars
with:
 Gary Hutchins – sequences, keyboards
 Alan Park – keyboards
 Bruce Nockles – trumpet
 Dave Morris – percussion
 David Motion – keyboards, drum machine
 Phil Thornalley – keyboards
 Boris Williams – "tippy tappy" drums
 David Bedford – string and woodwind arrangements
 Andrew Poppy – horn arrangements on "10 James Orr Street"
Technical
 David Motion – production, arrangements, engineering
 Phil Thornalley – production, engineering on "Let Her Go" and "Who Knows What Love Is?"
 Trig – engineering
 Peter McArthur – photography
 Chris Branfield – design
"Thanks to David Balfe and Bill Drummond"

Release history

References

Strawberry Switchblade albums
1985 debut albums
Warner Music Group albums